The Alliance to End Plastic Waste (AEPW) is an industry-founded and funded non-governmental and non-profit organization based in Singapore. Founding members include BASF, Chevron Phillips Chemical, ExxonMobil, Dow Chemical, Mitsubishi Chemical Holdings, Proctor & Gamble and Shell.

According to the company, the aim is to promote solutions that reduce and avoid environmental pollution from plastic waste, especially in the oceans. These solutions are based on the AEPW's four strategic pillars: infrastructure, innovation, education and engagement, and cleanup. The AEPW works with the World Economic Council for Sustainable Development as a strategic partner and the United Nations Environment Program. The group has been widely criticized as a greenwashing initiative that has not met ambitious goals for plastic cleanup, and using it's lobbying power to prevent regulation of plastics.

Initiatives
AEPW has promised to spend $1.5 billion by 2024 to reduce plastic pollution and increase recycling efforts. In September 2020 the group reported having spent $400 million USD on projects in $400 million in southeast Asia, Africa and India.

In November 2019 the group partnered with the Renew Oceans program to clean up plastic in the Ganges river. In October 2020 the program ceased operating, partly due to challenges presented by the COVID-19 pandemic. In 2022, the group partnered with the Plastic Bank launching Ocean Steward Educational Programme with the goal of encouraging kids to bring the plastic waste that they have at home to plastic collection branches at school.

Criticism
The group has been criticized for promoting a reduction of plastic waste rather than a reduction in plastic production. 
Moreover, the 5-year recycling target of 15 million tonnes is only 0.8% of the 1.8 billion tonnes of plastic waste production, and the actual recycling of plastic waste during 2019-2021 was only 4 thousand tonnes, compared to the 3-year target of 9 million tonnes.

References

External links

 Official site

Plastics and the environment
Corporate social responsibility
Defunct international non-governmental organizations
Plastic recycling